Mikhail Sergeyevich Gorbachev (2 March 1931 – 30 August 2022) was a Soviet and Russian politician who served as the eighth and final leader of the Soviet Union from 1985 to the country's dissolution in 1991. He served as General Secretary of the Communist Party of the Soviet Union from 1985 and additionally as head of state beginning in 1988, as Chairman of the Presidium of the Supreme Soviet from 1988 to 1989, Chairman of the Supreme Soviet from 1989 to 1990 and the only President of the Soviet Union from 1990 to 1991. Ideologically, Gorbachev initially adhered to Marxism–Leninism but moved towards social democracy by the early 1990s.

Gorbachev was born in Privolnoye, Russian SFSR, to a poor peasant family of Russian and Ukrainian heritage. Growing up under the rule of Joseph Stalin, in his youth, he operated combine harvesters on a collective farm before joining the Communist Party, which then governed the Soviet Union as a one-party state. Studying at Moscow State University, he married fellow student Raisa Titarenko in 1953 and received his law degree in 1955. Moving to Stavropol, he worked for the Komsomol youth organization and, after Stalin's death, became a keen proponent of the de-Stalinization reforms of Soviet leader Nikita Khrushchev. He was appointed the First Party Secretary of the Stavropol Regional Committee in 1970, overseeing the construction of the Great Stavropol Canal. In 1978, he returned to Moscow to become a Secretary of the party's Central Committee, and in 1979 joined its governing Politburo. Three years after the death of Soviet leader Leonid Brezhnev—following the brief tenures of Yuri Andropov and Konstantin Chernenko—in 1985, the Politburo elected Gorbachev as general secretary, the de facto leader.

Although committed to preserving the Soviet state and its Marxist–Leninist ideals, Gorbachev believed significant reform necessary for survival. He withdrew troops from the Soviet–Afghan War and embarked on summits with United States president Ronald Reagan to limit nuclear weapons and end the Cold War. Domestically, his policy of glasnost ("openness") allowed for enhanced freedom of speech and press, while his perestroika ("restructuring") sought to decentralize economic decision-making to improve its efficiency. His democratization measures and formation of the elected Congress of People's Deputies undermined the one-party state. Gorbachev declined to intervene militarily when various Eastern Bloc countries abandoned Marxist–Leninist governance in 1989–1992. Internally, growing nationalist sentiment threatened to break up the Soviet Union, leading Marxist–Leninist hardliners to launch the unsuccessful August Coup against Gorbachev in 1991. In the coup's wake, the Soviet Union dissolved against Gorbachev's wishes. After resigning from the presidency, he launched the Gorbachev Foundation, became a vocal critic of Russian presidents Boris Yeltsin and Vladimir Putin, and campaigned for Russia's social-democratic movement.

Gorbachev is considered one of the most significant figures of the second half of the 20th century. The recipient of a wide range of awards, including the Nobel Peace Prize, he is praised for his role in ending the Cold War, introducing new political and economic freedoms in the Soviet Union, and tolerating both the fall of Marxist–Leninist administrations in eastern and central Europe and the reunification of Germany. In Russia, he is often derided for facilitating the dissolution of the Soviet Union—an event which weakened Russia's global influence and precipitated an economic collapse in Russia and associated states.

Early life and education

1931–1950: Childhood 
Gorbachev was born on 2 March 1931 in the village of Privolnoye, then in the North Caucasus Krai of the Russian Soviet Federative Socialist Republic, Soviet Union. At the time, Privolnoye was divided almost evenly between ethnic Russians and ethnic Ukrainians. Gorbachev's paternal family were ethnic Russians and had moved to the region from Voronezh several generations before; his maternal family were of ethnic Ukrainian heritage and had migrated from Chernihiv. His parents named him Viktor at birth, but at the insistence of his mother—a devout Orthodox Christian—he had a secret baptism, where his grandfather christened him Mikhail. His relationship with his father, Sergey Andreyevich Gorbachev, was close; his mother, Maria Panteleyevna Gorbacheva (née Gopkalo), was colder and punitive. His parents were poor, and lived as peasants. They had married as teenagers in 1928, and in keeping with local tradition had initially resided in Sergey's father's house, an adobe-walled hut, before a hut of their own could be built.

The Soviet Union was a one-party state governed by the Communist Party, and during Gorbachev's childhood was under the leadership of Joseph Stalin. Stalin had initiated a project of mass rural collectivization which, in keeping with his Marxist–Leninist ideas, he believed would help convert the country into a socialist society. Gorbachev's maternal grandfather joined the Communist Party and helped form the village's first kolkhoz (collective farm) in 1929, becoming its chair. This farm was  outside Privolnoye village and when he was three years old, Gorbachev left his parental home and moved into the kolkhoz with his maternal grandparents.

The country was then experiencing the famine of 1930–1933, in which two of Gorbachev's paternal uncles and an aunt died. This was followed by the Great Purge, in which individuals accused of being "enemies of the people", including those sympathetic to rival interpretations of Marxism like Trotskyism, were arrested and interned in labor camps, if not executed. Both of Gorbachev's grandfathers were arrested (his maternal in 1934 and his paternal in 1937) and spent time in Gulag labor camps before being released. After his December 1938 release, Gorbachev's maternal grandfather discussed having been tortured by the secret police, an account that influenced the young boy.

Following on from the outbreak of the Second World War in 1939, in June 1941 the German Army invaded the Soviet Union. German forces occupied Privolnoye for four and a half months in 1942. Gorbachev's father had joined the Red Army and fought on the frontlines; he was wrongly declared dead during the conflict and fought in the Battle of Kursk before returning to his family, injured. After Germany was defeated, Gorbachev's parents had their second son, Aleksandr, in 1947; he and Mikhail would be their only children.

The village school was closed during much of the war but re-opened in autumn 1944. Gorbachev did not want to return but when he did he excelled academically. He read voraciously, moving from the Western novels of Thomas Mayne Reid to the works of Vissarion Belinsky, Alexander Pushkin, Nikolai Gogol, and Mikhail Lermontov. In 1946, he joined the Komsomol, the Soviet political youth organization, becoming leader of his local group and then being elected to the Komsomol committee for the district. From primary school he moved to the high school in Molotovskoye; he stayed there during the week while walking the  home during weekends. As well as being a member of the school's drama society, he organized sporting and social activities and led the school's morning exercise class. Over the course of five consecutive summers from 1946 onward he returned home to assist his father in operating a combine harvester, during which they sometimes worked 20-hour days. In 1948, they harvested over 8,000 centners of grain, a feat for which Sergey was awarded the Order of Lenin and his son the Order of the Red Banner of Labour.

1950–1955: University 

In June 1950, Gorbachev became a candidate member of the Communist Party. He also applied to study at the law school of Moscow State University (MSU), then the most prestigious university in the country. They accepted him without asking for an exam, likely because of his worker-peasant origins and his possession of the Order of the Red Banner of Labour. His choice of law was unusual; it was not a well-regarded subject in Soviet society at that time. Aged 19, he traveled by train to Moscow, the first time he had left his home region.

In Moscow, Gorbachev resided with fellow MSU students at a dormitory in the Sokolniki District. He and other rural students felt at odds with their Muscovite counterparts but he soon came to fit in. Fellow students recall him working especially hard, often late into the night. He gained a reputation as a mediator during disputes, and was also known for being outspoken in class, although he would reveal some of his views only privately; for instance, he confided in some students his opposition to the Soviet jurisprudential norm that a confession proved guilt, noting that confessions could have been forced. During his studies, an anti-semitic campaign spread through the Soviet Union, culminating in the Doctors' plot; Gorbachev publicly defended Volodya Liberman, a Jewish student who was accused of disloyalty to the country by one of his fellows.

At MSU, Gorbachev became the Komsomol head of his entering class, and then Komsomol's deputy secretary for agitation and propaganda at the law school. One of his first Komsomol assignments in Moscow was to monitor the election polling in Presnensky District to ensure the government's desire for near-total turnout; Gorbachev found that most of those who voted did so "out of fear". In 1952, he was appointed a full member of the Communist Party. As a party and Komsomol member, he was tasked with monitoring fellow students for potential subversion; some of his fellow students said that he did so only minimally and that they trusted him to keep confidential information secret from the authorities. Gorbachev became close friends with Zdeněk Mlynář, a Czechoslovak student who later became a primary ideologist of the 1968 Prague Spring. Mlynář recalled that the duo remained committed Marxist–Leninists despite their growing concerns about the Stalinist system. After Stalin died in March 1953, Gorbachev and Mlynář joined the crowds massing to see Stalin's body lying in state.

At MSU, Gorbachev met Raisa Titarenko, who was studying in the university's philosophy department. She was engaged to another man but after that engagement fell apart, she began a relationship with Gorbachev; together they went to bookstores, museums, and art exhibits. In early 1953, he took an internship at the procurator's office in Molotovskoye district, but was angered by the incompetence and arrogance of those working there. That summer, he returned to Privolnoye to work with his father on the harvest; the money earned allowed him to pay for a wedding. On 25 September 1953 he and Raisa registered their marriage at Sokolniki Registry Office; and in October moved in together at the Lenin Hills dormitory. Raisa discovered that she was pregnant and although the couple wanted to keep the child she fell ill and required a life-saving abortion.

In June 1955, Gorbachev graduated with a distinction; his final paper had been on the advantages of "socialist democracy" (the Soviet political system) over "bourgeois democracy" (liberal democracy). He was subsequently assigned to the Soviet Procurator's office, which was then focusing on the rehabilitation of the innocent victims of Stalin's purges, but found that they had no work for him. He was then offered a place on an MSU graduate course specializing in kolkhoz law, but declined. He had wanted to remain in Moscow, where Raisa was enrolled in a PhD program, but instead gained employment in Stavropol; Raisa abandoned her studies to join him there.

Early CPSU career

1955–1969: Stavropol Komsomol 

In August 1955, Gorbachev started work at the Stavropol regional procurator's office, but disliked the job and used his contacts to get a transfer to work for Komsomol, becoming deputy director of Komsomol's agitation and propaganda department for that region. In this position, he visited villages in the area and tried to improve the lives of their inhabitants; he established a discussion circle in Gorkaya Balka village to help its peasant residents gain social contacts.

Mikhail Gorbachev and his wife Raisa initially rented a small room in Stavropol, taking daily evening walks around the city and on weekends hiking in the countryside. In January 1957, Raisa gave birth to a daughter, Irina, and in 1958 they moved into two rooms in a communal apartment. In 1961, Gorbachev pursued a second degree, in agricultural production; he took a correspondence course from the local Stavropol Agricultural Institute, receiving his diploma in 1967. His wife had also pursued a second degree, attaining a PhD in sociology in 1967 from the Moscow State Pedagogical University; while in Stavropol she too joined the Communist Party.

Stalin was ultimately succeeded as Soviet leader by Nikita Khrushchev, who denounced Stalin and his cult of personality in a speech given in February 1956, after which he launched a de-Stalinization process throughout Soviet society. Later biographer William Taubman suggested that Gorbachev "embodied" the "reformist spirit" of the Khrushchev era. Gorbachev was among those who saw themselves as "genuine Marxists" or "genuine Leninists" in contrast to what they regarded as the perversions of Stalin. He helped spread Khrushchev's anti-Stalinist message in Stavropol, but encountered many who continued to regard Stalin as a hero or who praised the Stalinist purges as just.

Gorbachev rose steadily through the ranks of the local administration. The authorities regarded him as politically reliable, and he would flatter his superiors, for instance gaining favor with prominent local politician Fyodor Kulakov. With an ability to outmanoeuvre rivals, some colleagues resented his success. In September 1956, he was promoted First Secretary of the Stavropol city's Komsomol, placing him in charge of it; in April 1958 he was made deputy head of the Komsomol for the entire region. At this point he was given better accommodation: a two-room flat with its own private kitchen, toilet, and bathroom. In Stavropol, he formed a discussion club for youths, and helped mobilize local young people to take part in Khrushchev's agricultural and development campaigns.

In March 1961, Gorbachev became First Secretary of the regional Komsomol, in which position he went out of his way to appoint women as city and district leaders. In 1961, Gorbachev played host to the Italian delegation for the World Youth Festival in Moscow; that October, he also attended the 22nd Congress of the Communist Party of the Soviet Union. In January 1963, Gorbachev was promoted to personnel chief for the regional party's agricultural committee, and in September 1966 became First Secretary of the Stavropol City Party Organization ("Gorkom"). By 1968 he was increasingly frustrated with his job—in large part because Khrushchev's reforms were stalling or being reversed—and he contemplated leaving politics to work in academia. However, in August 1968, he was named Second Secretary of the Stavropol Kraikom, making him the deputy of First Secretary Leonid Yefremov and the second most senior figure in the Stavrapol region. In 1969, he was elected as a deputy to the Supreme Soviet of the Soviet Union and made a member of its Standing Commission for the Protection of the Environment.

Cleared for travel to Eastern Bloc countries, in 1966 he was part of a delegation which visited East Germany, and in 1969 and 1974 visited Bulgaria. In August 1968 the Soviet Union led an invasion of Czechoslovakia to put an end to the Prague Spring, a period of political liberalization in the Marxist–Leninist country. Although Gorbachev later stated that he had had private concerns about the invasion, he publicly supported it. In September 1969 he was part of a Soviet delegation sent to Czechoslovakia, where he found the Czechoslovak people largely unwelcoming to them. That year, the Soviet authorities ordered him to punish , a philosophy professor of the Stavropol agricultural institute whose ideas were regarded as critical of Soviet agricultural policy; Gorbachev ensured that Sadykov was fired from teaching but ignored calls for him to face tougher punishment. Gorbachev later related that he was "deeply affected" by the incident; "my conscience tormented me" for overseeing Sadykov's persecution.

1970–1977: Heading the Stavropol Region 
In April 1970, Yefremov was promoted to a higher position in Moscow and Gorbachev succeeded him as the First Secretary of the Stavropol kraikom. This granted Gorbachev significant power over the Stavropol region. He had been personally vetted for the position by senior Kremlin leaders and was informed of their decision by the Soviet leader, Leonid Brezhnev. Aged 39, he was considerably younger than his predecessors in the position. As head of the Stavropol region, he automatically became a member of the Central Committee of the Communist Party of the Soviet Union in 1971. According to biographer Zhores Medvedev, Gorbachev "had now joined the Party's super-elite". As regional leader, Gorbachev initially attributed economic and other failures to "the inefficiency and incompetence of cadres, flaws in management structure or gaps in legislation", but eventually concluded that they were caused by an excessive centralization of decision making in Moscow. He began reading translations of restricted texts by Western Marxist authors such as Antonio Gramsci, Louis Aragon, Roger Garaudy, and Giuseppe Boffa, and came under their influence.

Gorbachev's main task as regional leader was to raise agricultural production levels, a task hampered by severe droughts in 1975 and 1976.
He oversaw the expansion of irrigation systems through construction of the Great Stavropol Canal. For overseeing a record grain harvest in Ipatovsky district, in March 1972 he was awarded the Order of the October Revolution by Brezhnev in a Moscow ceremony. Gorbachev always sought to maintain Brezhnev's trust; as regional leader, he repeatedly praised Brezhnev in his speeches, for instance referring to him as "the outstanding statesman of our time". Gorbachev and his wife holidayed in Moscow, Leningrad, Uzbekistan, and resorts in the North Caucasus; he holidayed with the head of the KGB, Yuri Andropov, who was favorable towards him and who became an important patron. Gorbachev also developed good relationships with senior figures including the Soviet Prime Minister, Alexei Kosygin, and the longstanding senior party member Mikhail Suslov.

The government considered Gorbachev sufficiently reliable that he was sent as part of Soviet delegations to Western Europe; he made five trips there between 1970 and 1977. In September 1971 he was part of a delegation that traveled to Italy, where they met with representatives of the Italian Communist Party; Gorbachev loved Italian culture but was struck by the poverty and inequality he saw in the country. In 1972, he visited Belgium and the Netherlands, and in 1973 West Germany. Gorbachev and his wife visited France in 1976 and 1977, on the latter occasion touring the country with a guide from the French Communist Party. He was surprised by how openly West Europeans offered their opinions and criticized their political leaders, something absent from the Soviet Union, where most people did not feel safe speaking so openly. He later related that for him and his wife, these visits "shook our a priori belief in the superiority of socialist over bourgeois democracy".

Gorbachev had remained close to his parents; after his father became terminally ill in 1974, Gorbachev traveled to be with him in Privolnoe shortly before his death. His daughter, Irina, married fellow student Anatoly Virgansky in April 1978. In 1977, the Supreme Soviet appointed Gorbachev to chair the Standing Commission on Youth Affairs due to his experience with mobilizing young people in Komsomol.

Secretary of the Central Committee of CPSU 

In November 1978, Gorbachev was appointed a Secretary of the Central Committee. His appointment had been approved unanimously by the Central Committee's members. To fill this position, Gorbachev and his wife moved to Moscow, where they were initially given an old dacha outside the city. They then moved to another, at Sosnovka, before finally being allocated a newly built brick house. He was also given an apartment inside the city, but gave that to his daughter and son-in-law; Irina had begun work at Moscow's Second Medical Institute. As part of the Moscow political elite, Gorbachev and his wife now had access to better medical care and to specialized shops; they were also given cooks, servants, bodyguards, and secretaries, although many of these were spies for the KGB. In his new position, Gorbachev often worked twelve to sixteen hour days. He and his wife socialized little, but liked to visit Moscow's theaters and museums.

In 1978, Gorbachev was appointed to the Central Committee's Secretariat for Agriculture, replacing his old friend Kulakov, who had died of a heart attack. Gorbachev concentrated his attentions on agriculture: the harvests of 1979, 1980, and 1981 were all poor, due largely to weather conditions, and the country had to import increasing quantities of grain. He had growing concerns about the country's agricultural management system, coming to regard it as overly centralized and requiring more bottom-up decision making; he raised these points at his first speech at a Central Committee Plenum, given in July 1978. He began to have concerns about other policies too. In December 1979, the Soviets sent the armed forces into neighbouring Afghanistan to support its Soviet-aligned government against Islamist insurgents; Gorbachev privately thought it a mistake. At times he openly supported the government position; in October 1980 he for instance endorsed Soviet calls for Poland's Marxist–Leninist government to crack down on growing internal dissent in that country. That same month, he was promoted from a candidate member to a full member of the Politburo, the highest decision-making authority in the Communist Party. At the time, he was the Politburo's youngest member.

After Brezhnev's death in November 1982, Andropov succeeded him as General Secretary of the Communist Party, the de facto leader in the Soviet Union. Gorbachev was enthusiastic about the appointment. However, although Gorbachev hoped that Andropov would introduce liberalizing reforms, the latter carried out only personnel shifts rather than structural change. Gorbachev became Andropov's closest ally in the Politburo; with Andropov's encouragement, Gorbachev sometimes chaired Politburo meetings. Andropov encouraged Gorbachev to expand into policy areas other than agriculture, preparing him for future higher office. In April 1983, Gorbachev delivered the annual speech marking the birthday of the Soviet founder Vladimir Lenin; this required him re-reading many of Lenin's later writings, in which the latter had called for reform in the context of the New Economic Policy of the 1920s, and encouraged Gorbachev's own conviction that reform was needed. In May 1983, Gorbachev was sent to Canada, where he met Prime Minister Pierre Trudeau and spoke to the Canadian Parliament. There, he met and befriended the Soviet ambassador, Aleksandr Yakovlev, who later became a key political ally.

In February 1984, Andropov died; on his deathbed he indicated his desire that Gorbachev succeed him. Many in the Central Committee nevertheless thought the 53-year-old Gorbachev was too young and inexperienced. Instead, Konstantin Chernenko—a longstanding Brezhnev ally—was appointed general secretary, but he too was in very poor health. Chernenko was often too sick to chair Politburo meetings, with Gorbachev stepping in last minute. Gorbachev continued to cultivate allies both in the Kremlin and beyond, and also gave the main speech at a conference on Soviet ideology, where he angered party hardliners by implying that the country required reform.

In April 1984, Gorbachev was appointed chair of the Foreign Affairs Committee of the Soviet legislature, a largely honorific position. In June he traveled to Italy as a Soviet representative for the funeral of Italian Communist Party leader Enrico Berlinguer, and in September to Sofia, Bulgaria to attend celebrations of the fortieth anniversary of its liberation from the Nazis by the Red Army. In December, he visited Britain at the request of its Prime Minister Margaret Thatcher; she was aware that he was a potential reformer and wanted to meet him. At the end of the visit, Thatcher said: "I like Mr. Gorbachev. We can do business together". He felt that the visit helped to erode Andrei Gromyko's dominance of Soviet foreign policy while at the same time sending a signal to the United States government that he wanted to improve Soviet-U.S. relations.

General Secretary of the CPSU 

On 10 March 1985, Chernenko died. Gromyko proposed Gorbachev as the next general secretary; as a longstanding party member, Gromyko's recommendation carried great weight among the Central Committee. Gorbachev expected much opposition to his nomination as general secretary, but ultimately the rest of the Politburo supported him. Shortly after Chernenko's death, the Politburo unanimously elected Gorbachev as his successor; they wanted him rather than another elderly leader. He thus became the eighth leader of the Soviet Union. Few in the government imagined that he would be as radical a reformer as he proved. Although not a well-known figure to the Soviet public, there was widespread relief that the new leader was not elderly and ailing. Gorbachev's first public appearance as leader was at Chernenko's Red Square funeral, held on 14 March. Two months after being elected, he left Moscow for the first time, traveling to Leningrad, where he spoke to assembled crowds. In June he traveled to Ukraine, in July to Belarus, and in September to Tyumen Oblast, urging party members in these areas to take more responsibility for fixing local problems.

1985–1986: Early years 
Gorbachev's leadership style differed from that of his predecessors. He would stop to talk to civilians on the street, forbade the display of his portrait at the 1985 Red Square holiday celebrations, and encouraged frank and open discussions at Politburo meetings. To the West, Gorbachev was seen as a more moderate and less threatening Soviet leader; some Western commentators however believed this an act to lull Western governments into a false sense of security. His wife was his closest adviser, and took on the unofficial role of a "first lady" by appearing with him on foreign trips; her public visibility was a breach of standard practice and generated resentment. His other close aides were Georgy Shakhnazarov and Anatoly Chernyaev.

Gorbachev was aware that the Politburo could remove him from office, and that he could not pursue more radical reform without a majority of supporters in the Politburo. He sought to remove several older members from the Politburo, encouraging Grigory Romanov, Nikolai Tikhonov, and Viktor Grishin into retirement. He promoted Gromyko to head of state, a largely ceremonial role with little influence, and moved his own ally, Eduard Shevardnadze, to Gromyko's former post in charge of foreign policy. Other allies whom he saw promoted were Yakovlev, Anatoly Lukyanov, and Vadim Medvedev. Another of those promoted by Gorbachev was Boris Yeltsin, who was made a Secretary of the Central Committee in July 1985. Most of these appointees were from a new generation of well-educated officials who had been frustrated during the Brezhnev era. In his first year, 14 of the 23 heads of department in the secretariat were replaced. Doing so, Gorbachev secured dominance in the Politburo within a year, faster than either Stalin, Khrushchev, or Brezhnev had achieved.

Domestic policies 

Gorbachev recurrently employed the term perestroika, first used publicly in March 1984. He saw perestroika as encompassing a complex series of reforms to restructure society and the economy. He was concerned by the country's low productivity, poor work ethic, and inferior quality goods; like several economists, he feared this would lead to the country becoming a second-rate power. The first stage of Gorbachev's perestroika was uskoreniye ("acceleration"), a term he used regularly in the first two years of his leadership. The Soviet Union was behind the United States in many areas of production, but Gorbachev claimed that it would accelerate industrial output to match that of the U.S. by 2000. The Five Year Plan of 1985–1990 was targeted to expand machine building by 50 to 100%. To boost agricultural productivity, he merged five ministries and a state committee into a single entity, Agroprom, although by late 1986 he acknowledged this merger as a failure.

The purpose of reform was to prop up the centrally planned economy—not to transition to market socialism. Speaking in late summer 1985 to the secretaries for economic affairs of the central committees of the East European communist parties, Gorbachev said: "Many of you see the solution to your problems in resorting to market mechanisms in place of direct planning. Some of you look at the market as a lifesaver for your economies. But, comrades, you should not think about lifesavers but about the ship, and the ship is socialism."
Gorbachev's perestroika also entailed attempts to move away from technocratic management of the economy by increasingly involving the labor force in industrial production. He was of the view that once freed from the strong control of central planners, state-owned enterprises would act as market agents. Gorbachev and other Soviet leaders did not anticipate opposition to the perestroika reforms; according to their interpretation of Marxism, they believed that in a socialist society like the Soviet Union there would not be "antagonistic contradictions". However, there would come to be a public perception in the country that many bureaucrats were paying lip service to the reforms while trying to undermine them. He also initiated the concept of gospriyomka (state acceptance of production) during his time as leader, which represented quality control. In April 1986, he introduced an agrarian reform which linked salaries to output and allowed collective farms to sell 30% of their produce directly to shops or co-operatives rather than giving it all to the state for distribution. In a September 1986 speech, he embraced the idea of reintroducing market economics to the country alongside limited private enterprise, citing Lenin's New Economic Policy as a precedent; he nevertheless stressed that he did not regard this as a return to capitalism.

In the Soviet Union, alcohol consumption had risen steadily between 1950 and 1985. By the 1980s, drunkenness was a major social problem and Andropov had planned a major campaign to limit alcohol consumption. Encouraged by his wife, Gorbachev—who believed the campaign would improve health and work efficiency—oversaw its implementation. Alcohol production was reduced by around 40%, the legal drinking age rose from 18 to 21, alcohol prices were increased, stores were banned from selling it before 2 pm, and tougher penalties were introduced for workplace or public drunkenness and home production of alcohol. The All-Union Voluntary Society for the Struggle for Temperance was formed to promote sobriety; it had over 14 million members within three years. As a result, crime rates fell and life expectancy grew slightly between 1986 and 1987. However, bootleg liquor production rose considerably, and the reform imposed large costs on the Soviet economy, resulting in losses of up to US$100 billion between 1985 and 1990. Gorbachev later considered the campaign to have been an error, and it was terminated in October 1988. After it ended, it took several years for production to return to previous levels, after which alcohol consumption soared in Russia between 1990 and 1993.

In the second year of his leadership, Gorbachev began speaking of glasnost, or "openness". According to Doder and Branson, this meant "greater openness and candour in government affairs and for an interplay of different and sometimes conflicting views in political debates, in the press, and in Soviet culture". Encouraging reformers into prominent media positions, he brought in Sergei Zalygin as head of Novy Mir magazine and Yegor Yakovlev as editor-in-chief of Moscow News. He made the historian Yury Afanasyev dean of the State Historical Archive Faculty, from where Afansiev could press for the opening of secret archives and the reassessment of Soviet history. Prominent dissidents like Andrei Sakharov were freed from internal exile or prison. Gorbachev saw glasnost as a necessary measure to ensure perestroika by alerting the Soviet populace to the nature of the country's problems in the hope that they would support his efforts to fix them. Particularly popular among the Soviet intelligentsia, who became key Gorbachev supporters, glasnost boosted his domestic popularity but alarmed many Communist Party hardliners. For many Soviet citizens, this newfound level of freedom of speech and press—and its accompanying revelations about the country's past—was uncomfortable.

Some in the party thought Gorbachev was not going far enough in his reforms; a prominent liberal critic was Yeltsin. He had risen rapidly since 1985, attaining the role of party secretary in Moscow. Like many members of the government, Gorbachev was skeptical of Yeltsin, believing that he engaged in too much self-promotion. Yeltsin was also critical of Gorbachev, regarding him as patronizing.
In early 1986, Yeltsin began sniping at Gorbachev in Politburo meetings. At the Twenty-Seventh Party Congress in February, Yeltsin called for more far-reaching reforms than Gorbachev was initiating and criticized the party leadership, although he did not cite Gorbachev by name, claiming that a new cult of personality was forming. Gorbachev then opened the floor to responses, after which attendees publicly criticized Yeltsin for several hours. After this, Gorbachev also criticized Yeltsin, claiming that he cared only for himself and was "politically illiterate". Yeltsin then resigned both as Moscow party secretary and as a member of the Politburo. From this point, tensions between the two men developed into a mutual hatred.

In April 1986 the Chernobyl disaster occurred. In the immediate aftermath, officials fed Gorbachev incorrect information to downplay the incident. As the scale of the disaster became apparent, 336,000 people were evacuated from the area around Chernobyl. Taubman noted that the disaster marked "a turning point for Gorbachev and the Soviet regime". Several days after it occurred, he gave a televised report to the nation. He cited the disaster as evidence for what he regarded as widespread problems in Soviet society, such as shoddy workmanship and workplace inertia. Gorbachev later described the incident as one which made him appreciate the scale of incompetence and cover-ups in the Soviet Union. From April to the end of the year, Gorbachev became increasingly open in his criticism of the Soviet system, including food production, state bureaucracy, the military draft, and the large size of the prison population.

Foreign policy 

In a May 1985 speech given to the Soviet Foreign Ministry—the first time a Soviet leader had directly addressed his country's diplomats—Gorbachev spoke of a "radical restructuring" of foreign policy. A major issue facing his leadership was Soviet involvement in the Afghan Civil War, which had then been going on for over five years. Over the course of the war, the Soviet Army took heavy casualties and there was much opposition to Soviet involvement among both the public and military. On becoming leader, Gorbachev saw withdrawal from the war as a key priority. In October 1985, he met with Afghan Marxist leader Babrak Karmal, urging him to acknowledge the lack of widespread public support for his government and pursue a power sharing agreement with the opposition. That month, the Politburo approved Gorbachev's decision to withdraw combat troops from Afghanistan, although the last troops did not leave until February 1989.

Gorbachev had inherited a renewed period of high tension in the Cold War. He believed strongly in the need to sharply improve relations with the United States; he was appalled at the prospect of nuclear war, was aware that the Soviet Union was unlikely to win the arms race, and thought that the continued focus on high military spending was detrimental to his desire for domestic reform. Although privately also appalled at the prospect of nuclear war, U.S. President Ronald Reagan publicly appeared to not want a de-escalation of tensions, having scrapped détente and arms controls, initiating a military build-up, and calling the Soviet Union the "evil empire".

Both Gorbachev and Reagan wanted a summit to discuss the Cold War, but each faced some opposition to such a move within their respective governments. They agreed to hold a summit in Geneva, Switzerland, in November 1985. In the buildup to this, Gorbachev sought to improve relations with the U.S.'s NATO allies, visiting France in October 1985 to meet with President François Mitterrand. At the Geneva summit, discussions between Gorbachev and Reagan were sometimes heated, and Gorbachev was initially frustrated that his U.S. counterpart "does not seem to hear what I am trying to say". As well as discussing the Cold War proxy conflicts in Afghanistan and Nicaragua and human rights issues, the pair discussed the U.S.'s Strategic Defense Initiative (SDI), to which Gorbachev was strongly opposed. The duo's wives also met and spent time together at the summit. The summit ended with a joint commitment to avoiding nuclear war and to meet for two further summits: in Washington D.C. in 1986 and in Moscow in 1987. Following the conference, Gorbachev traveled to Prague to inform other Warsaw Pact leaders of developments.

In January 1986, Gorbachev publicly proposed a three-stage programme for abolishing the world's nuclear weapons by the end of the 20th century. An agreement was then reached to meet with Reagan in Reykjavík, Iceland, in October 1986. Gorbachev wanted to secure guarantees that SDI would not be implemented, and in return was willing to offer concessions, including a 50% reduction in Soviet long range nuclear missiles. Both leaders agreed with the shared goal of abolishing nuclear weapons, but Reagan refused to terminate the SDI program and no deal was reached. After the summit, many of Reagan's allies criticized him for going along with the idea of abolishing nuclear weapons. Gorbachev meanwhile told the Politburo that Reagan was "extraordinarily primitive, troglodyte, and intellectually feeble".

In his relations with the developing world, Gorbachev found many of its leaders professing revolutionary socialist credentials or a pro-Soviet attitude—such as Libya's Muammar Gaddafi and Syria's Hafez al-Assad—frustrating, and his best personal relationship was instead with India's Prime Minister, Rajiv Gandhi. He thought that the "socialist camp" of Marxist–Leninist governed states—the Eastern Bloc countries, North Korea, Vietnam, and Cuba—were a drain on the Soviet economy, receiving a far greater amount of goods from the Soviet Union than they collectively gave in return. He sought improved relations with China, a country whose Marxist government had severed ties with the Soviets in the Sino-Soviet Split and had since undergone its own structural reform. In June 1985 he signed a US$14 billion five-year trade agreement with the country and in July 1986, he proposed troop reductions along the Soviet-Chinese border, hailing China as "a great socialist country". He made clear his desire for Soviet membership of the Asian Development Bank and for greater ties to Pacific countries, especially China and Japan.

1987–1989: Further reforms

Domestic reforms 

In January 1987, Gorbachev attended a Central Committee plenum where he talked about perestroika and democratization while criticizing widespread corruption. He considered putting a proposal to allow multi-party elections into his speech, but decided against doing so. After the plenum, he focused his attentions on economic reform, holding discussions with government officials and economists. Many economists proposed reducing ministerial controls on the economy and allowing state-owned enterprises to set their own targets; Ryzhkov and other government figures were skeptical. In June, Gorbachev finished his report on economic reform. It reflected a compromise: ministers would retain the ability to set output targets but these would not be considered binding. That month, a plenum accepted his recommendations and the Supreme Soviet passed a "law on enterprises" implementing the changes. Economic problems remained: by the late 1980s there were still widespread shortages of basic goods, rising inflation, and declining living standards. These stoked a number of miners' strikes in 1989.

By 1987, the ethos of glasnost had spread through Soviet society: journalists were writing increasingly openly, many economic problems were being publicly revealed, and studies appeared that critically reassessed Soviet history. Gorbachev was broadly supportive, describing glasnost as "the crucial, irreplaceable weapon of perestroika". He nevertheless insisted that people should use the newfound freedom responsibly, stating that journalists and writers should avoid "sensationalism" and be "completely objective" in their reporting. Nearly two hundred previously restricted Soviet films were publicly released, and a range of Western films were also made available. In 1989, Soviet responsibility for the 1940 Katyn massacre was finally revealed.

In September 1987, the government stopped jamming the signal of the British Broadcasting Corporation and Voice of America. The reforms also included greater tolerance of religion; an Easter service was broadcast on Soviet television for the first time and the millennium celebrations of the Russian Orthodox Church were given media attention. Independent organizations appeared, most supportive of Gorbachev, although the largest, Pamyat, was ultra-nationalist and antisemitic in nature. Gorbachev also announced that Soviet Jews wishing to migrate to Israel would be allowed to do so, something previously prohibited.

In August 1987, Gorbachev holidayed in Nizhnyaya Oreanda in Oreanda, Crimea, there writing Perestroika: New Thinking for Our Country and Our World at the suggestion of U.S. publishers. For the 70th anniversary of the October Revolution of 1917—which brought Lenin and the Communist Party to power—Gorbachev produced a speech on "October and Perestroika: The Revolution Continues". Delivered to a ceremonial joint session of the Central Committee and the Supreme Soviet in the Kremlin Palace of Congresses, it praised Lenin but criticized Stalin for overseeing mass human rights abuses. Party hardliners thought the speech went too far; liberalisers thought it did not go far enough.

In March 1988, the magazine Sovetskaya Rossiya published an open letter by the teacher Nina Andreyeva. It criticized elements of Gorbachev's reforms, attacking what she regarded as the denigration of the Stalinist era and arguing that a reformer clique—whom she implied were mostly Jews and ethnic minorities—were to blame. Over 900 Soviet newspapers reprinted it and anti-reformists rallied around it; many reformers panicked, fearing a backlash against perestroika. On returning from Yugoslavia, Gorbachev called a Politburo meeting to discuss the letter, at which he confronted those hardliners supporting its sentiment. Ultimately, the Politburo arrived at a unanimous decision to express disapproval of Andreyeva's letter and publish a rebuttal in Pravda. Yakovlev and Gorbachev's rebuttal claimed that those who "look everywhere for internal enemies" were "not patriots" and presented Stalin's "guilt for massive repressions and lawlessness" as "enormous and unforgiveable".

Forming the Congress of People's Deputies 
Although the next party congress was not scheduled until 1991, Gorbachev convened the 19th Party Conference in its place in June 1988. He hoped that by allowing a broader range of people to attend than at previous conferences, he would gain additional support for his reforms. With sympathetic officials and academics, Gorbachev drafted plans for reforms that would shift power away from the Politburo and towards the soviets. While the soviets had become largely powerless bodies that rubber-stamped Politburo policies, he wanted them to become year-round legislatures. He proposed the formation of a new institution, the Congress of People's Deputies, whose members were to be elected in a largely free vote. This congress would in turn elect a USSR Supreme Soviet, which would do most of the legislating.

These proposals reflected Gorbachev's desire for more democracy; however, in his view there was a major impediment in that the Soviet people had developed a "slave psychology" after centuries of Tsarist autocracy and Marxist–Leninist authoritarianism. Held at the Kremlin Palace of Congresses, the conference brought together 5,000 delegates and featured arguments between hardliners and liberalisers. The proceedings were televised, and for the first time since the 1920s, voting was not unanimous. In the months following the conference, Gorbachev focused on redesigning and streamlining the party apparatus; the Central Committee staff—which then numbered around 3,000—was halved, while various Central Committee departments were merged to cut down the overall number from twenty to nine.

In March and April 1989, elections to the new Congress were held. Of the 2,250 legislators to be elected, one hundred – termed the "Red Hundred" by the press – were directly chosen by the Communist Party, with Gorbachev ensuring many were reformists. Although over 85% of elected deputies were party members, many of those elected—including Sakharov and Yeltsin—were liberalisers. Gorbachev was happy with the result, describing it as "an enormous political victory under extraordinarily difficult circumstances". The new Congress convened in May 1989. Gorbachev was then elected its chair—the new de facto head of state—with 2,123 votes in favor to 87 against. Its sessions were televised live, and its members elected the new Supreme Soviet. At the Congress, Sakharov spoke repeatedly, exasperating Gorbachev with his calls for greater liberalization and the introduction of private property. When Sakharov died shortly after, Yeltsin became the figurehead of the liberal opposition.

Relations with China and Western states 

Gorbachev tried to improve relations with the UK, France, and West Germany; like previous Soviet leaders, he was interested in pulling Western Europe away from U.S. influence. Calling for greater pan-European co-operation, he publicly spoke of a "Common European Home" and of a Europe "from the Atlantic to the Urals". In March 1987, Thatcher visited Gorbachev in Moscow; despite their ideological differences, they liked one another. In April 1989 he visited London, lunching with Elizabeth II. In May 1987, Gorbachev again visited France, and in November 1988 Mitterrand visited him in Moscow. The West German Chancellor, Helmut Kohl, had initially offended Gorbachev by comparing him to Nazi propagandist Joseph Goebbels, although he later informally apologized and in October 1988 visited Moscow. In June 1989 Gorbachev then visited Kohl in West Germany. In November 1989 he also visited Italy, meeting with Pope John Paul II. Gorbachev's relationships with these West European leaders were typically far warmer than those he had with their Eastern Bloc counterparts.

Gorbachev continued to pursue good relations with China to heal the Sino-Soviet Split. In May 1989 he visited Beijing and there met its leader Deng Xiaoping; Deng shared Gorbachev's belief in economic reform but rejected calls for democratization. Pro-democracy students had massed in Tiananmen Square during Gorbachev's visit but after he left were massacred by troops. Gorbachev did not condemn the massacre publicly but it reinforced his commitment not to use violent force in dealing with pro-democracy protests in the Eastern Bloc.

Following the failures of earlier talks with the U.S., in February 1987, Gorbachev held a conference in Moscow, titled "For a World without Nuclear Weapons, for Mankind's Survival", which was attended by various international celebrities and politicians. By publicly pushing for nuclear disarmament, Gorbachev sought to give the Soviet Union the moral high ground and weaken the West's self-perception of moral superiority. Aware that Reagan would not budge on SDI, Gorbachev focused on reducing "Intermediate-Range Nuclear Forces", to which Reagan was receptive. In April 1987, Gorbachev discussed the issue with U.S. Secretary of State George P. Shultz in Moscow; he agreed to eliminate the Soviets' SS-23 rockets and allow U.S. inspectors to visit Soviet military facilities to ensure compliance. There was hostility to such compromises from the Soviet military, but following the May 1987 Mathias Rust incident—in which a West German teenager was able to fly undetected from Finland and land in Red Square—Gorbachev fired many senior military figures for incompetence. In December 1987, Gorbachev visited Washington D.C., where he and Reagan signed the Intermediate-Range Nuclear Forces Treaty. Taubman called it "one of the highest points of Gorbachev's career".

A second U.S.-Soviet summit occurred in Moscow in May–June 1988, which Gorbachev expected to be largely symbolic. Again, he and Reagan criticized each other's countries—Reagan raising Soviet restrictions on religious freedom; Gorbachev highlighting poverty and racial discrimination in the U.S., but Gorbachev related that they spoke "on friendly terms". They reached an agreement on notifying each other before conducting ballistic missile tests and made agreements on transport, fishing, and radio navigation. At the summit, Reagan told reporters that he no longer considered the Soviet Union an "evil empire" and the two revealed that they considered themselves friends.

The third summit was held in New York City in December. Arriving there, Gorbachev gave a speech to the United Nations General Assembly where he announced a unilateral reduction in the Soviet armed forces by 500,000; he also announced that 50,000 troops would be withdrawn from Central and Eastern Europe. He then met with Reagan and President-elect George H. W. Bush, following which he rushed home, skipping a planned visit to Cuba, to deal with the Armenian earthquake. On becoming U.S. president, Bush appeared interested in continuing talks with Gorbachev but wanted to appear tougher on the Soviets than Reagan had to allay criticism from the right wing of his Republican Party. In December 1989, Gorbachev and Bush met at the Malta Summit. Bush offered to assist the Soviet economy by suspending the Jackson-Vanik Amendment and repealing the Stevenson and Baird Amendments. There, they agreed to a joint press conference, the first time that a U.S. and Soviet leader had done so. Gorbachev also urged Bush to normalize relations with Cuba and meet its president, Fidel Castro, although Bush refused to do so.

Nationality question and the Eastern Bloc 

On taking power, Gorbachev found some unrest among different national groups within the Soviet Union. In December 1986, riots broke out in several Kazakh cities after a Russian was appointed head of the region. In 1987, Crimean Tatars protested in Moscow to demand resettlement in Crimea, the area from which they had been deported on Stalin's orders in 1944. Gorbachev ordered a commission, headed by Gromyko, to examine their situation. Gromyko's report opposed calls for assisting Tatar resettlement in Crimea. By 1988, the Soviet "nationality question" was increasingly pressing. In February, the administration of the Nagorno-Karabakh Autonomous Oblast officially requested that it be transferred from the Azerbaijan Soviet Socialist Republic to the Armenian Soviet Socialist Republic; the majority of the region's population were ethnically Armenian and wanted unification with other majority Armenian areas. As rival Armenian and Azerbaijani demonstrations took place in Nagorno-Karabakh, Gorbachev called an emergency meeting of the Politburo. Ultimately, Gorbachev promised greater autonomy for Nagorno-Karabakh but refused the transfer, fearing that it would set off similar ethnic tensions and demands throughout the Soviet Union.

That month, in the Azerbaijani city of Sumgait, Azerbaijani gangs began killing members of the Armenian minority. Local troops tried to quell the unrest but were attacked by mobs. The Politburo ordered additional troops into the city, but in contrast to those like Ligachev who wanted a massive display of force, Gorbachev urged restraint. He believed that the situation could be resolved through a political solution, urging talks between the Armenian and Azerbaijani Communist Parties. Further anti-Armenian violence broke out in Baku in January 1990, followed by the Soviet Army killing about 150 Azeris. Problems also emerged in the Georgian Soviet Socialist Republic; in April 1989, Soviet troops crushed Georgian pro-independence demonstrations in Tbilisi, resulting in various deaths. Independence sentiment was also rising in the Baltic states; the Supreme Soviets of the Estonian, Lithuanian, and Latvian Soviet Socialist Republics declared their economic "autonomy" from the Soviet central government and introduced measures to restrict Russian immigration. In August 1989, protesters formed the Baltic Way, a human chain across the three countries to symbolize their wish to restore independence. That month, the Lithuanian Supreme Soviet ruled the 1940 Soviet annexation of their country to be illegal; in January 1990, Gorbachev visited the republic to encourage it to remain part of the Soviet Union.

Gorbachev rejected the Brezhnev Doctrine, the idea that the Soviet Union had the right to intervene militarily in other Marxist–Leninist countries if their governments were threatened. In December 1987 he announced the withdrawal of 500,000 Soviet troops from Central and Eastern Europe.
While pursuing domestic reforms, he did not publicly support reformers elsewhere in the Eastern Bloc. Hoping instead to lead by example, he later related that he did not want to interfere in their internal affairs, but he may have feared that pushing reform in Central and Eastern Europe would have angered his own hardliners too much. Some Eastern Bloc leaders, like Hungary's János Kádár and Poland's Wojciech Jaruzelski, were sympathetic to reform; others, like Romania's Nicolae Ceaușescu, were hostile to it. In May 1987 Gorbachev visited Romania, where he was appalled by the state of the country, later telling the Politburo that there "human dignity has absolutely no value". He and Ceaușescu disliked each other, and argued over Gorbachev's reforms.

In August 1989, the Pan-European Picnic, which Otto von Habsburg planned as a test of Gorbachev, resulted in a large mass exodus of East German refugees. According to the "Sinatra Doctrine", the Soviet Union did not interfere and the media-informed Eastern European population realized that on the one hand their rulers were increasingly losing power and on the other hand the Iron Curtain was falling apart as a bracket for the Eastern Bloc.

Unraveling of the USSR 
In the Revolutions of 1989, most of the Marxist–Leninist states of Central and Eastern Europe held multi-party elections resulting in regime change. In most countries, like Poland and Hungary, this was achieved peacefully, but in Romania, the revolution turned violent, and led to Ceaușescu's overthrow and execution. Gorbachev was too preoccupied with domestic problems to pay much attention to these events. He believed that democratic elections would not lead Eastern European countries into abandoning their commitment to socialism. In 1989, he visited East Germany for the fortieth anniversary of its founding; shortly after, in November, the East German government allowed its citizens to cross the Berlin Wall, a decision Gorbachev praised. Over the following years, much of the wall was demolished. Neither Gorbachev nor Thatcher or Mitterrand wanted a swift reunification of Germany, aware that it would likely become the dominant European power. Gorbachev wanted a gradual process of German integration but Kohl began calling for rapid reunification. With German reunification in 1990, many observers declared the Cold War over.

1990–1991: Presidency of the Soviet Union 

In February 1990, both liberalisers and Marxist–Leninist hardliners intensified their attacks on Gorbachev. A liberalizer march took place in Moscow criticizing Communist Party rule, while at a Central Committee meeting, the hardliner Vladimir Brovikov accused Gorbachev of reducing the country to "anarchy" and "ruin" and of pursuing Western approval at the expense of the Soviet Union and the Marxist–Leninist cause. Gorbachev was aware that the Central Committee could still oust him as general secretary, and so decided to reformulate the role of head of government to a presidency from which he could not be removed. He decided that the presidential election should be held by the Congress of People's Deputies. He chose this over a public vote because he thought the latter would escalate tensions and feared that he might lose it; a spring 1990 poll nevertheless still showed him as the most popular politician in the country.

In March, the Congress of People's Deputies held the first (and only) Soviet presidential election, in which Gorbachev was the only candidate. He secured 1,329 in favor to 495 against; 313 votes were invalid or absent. He therefore became the first executive President of the Soviet Union. A new 18-member Presidential Council de facto replaced the Politburo. At the same Congress meeting, he presented the idea of repealing Article 6 of the Soviet constitution, which had ratified the Communist Party as the "ruling party" of the Soviet Union. The Congress passed the reform, undermining the de jure nature of the one-party state.

In the 1990 elections for the Russian Supreme Soviet, the Communist Party faced challengers from an alliance of liberalisers known as "Democratic Russia"; the latter did particularly well in urban centers. Yeltsin was elected the parliament's chair, something Gorbachev was unhappy about. That year, opinion polls showed Yeltsin overtaking Gorbachev as the most popular politician in the Soviet Union. Gorbachev struggled to understand Yeltsin's growing popularity, commenting: "he drinks like a fish ... he's inarticulate, he comes up with the devil knows what, he's like a worn-out record". The Russian Supreme Soviet was now out of Gorbachev's control; in June 1990, it declared that in the Russian Republic, its laws took precedence over those of the Soviet central government. Amid a growth in Russian nationalist sentiment, Gorbachev had reluctantly allowed the formation of a Communist Party of the Russian Soviet Federative Socialist Republic as a branch of the larger Soviet Communist Party. Gorbachev attended its first congress in June, but soon found it dominated by hardliners who opposed his reformist stance.

German reunification and the Gulf War 
In January 1990, Gorbachev privately agreed to permit East German reunification with West Germany, but rejected the idea that a unified Germany could retain West Germany's NATO membership. His compromise that Germany might retain both NATO and Warsaw Pact memberships did not attract support. On 9 February 1990 in a phone conversation with James Baker, then the US Secretary of State, he set out his position that "a broadening of the NATO zone is not acceptable" to which Baker agreed. Scholars are puzzled why Gorbachev never pursued a written pledge. In May 1990, he visited the U.S. for talks with President Bush; there, he agreed that an independent Germany would have the right to choose its international alliances. Ultimately he acquiesced to the reunification on the condition that NATO troops not be posted to the territory of Eastern Germany. There remains some confusion over whether US Secretary of State James Baker led Gorbachev to believe that NATO would not expand into other countries in Eastern Europe as well. There was no oral or written U.S. promise that explicitly said so. Gorbachev himself has stated that he was only made such a promise regarding East Germany and that it was kept. In July, Kohl visited Moscow and Gorbachev informed him that the Soviets would not oppose a reunified Germany being part of NATO. Domestically, Gorbachev's critics accused him of betraying the national interest; more broadly, they were angry that Gorbachev had allowed the Eastern Bloc to move away from direct Soviet influence.

In August 1990, Saddam Hussein's Iraqi government invaded Kuwait; Gorbachev endorsed President Bush's condemnation of it. This brought criticism from many in the Soviet state apparatus, who saw Hussein as a key ally in the Persian Gulf and feared for the safety of the 9,000 Soviet citizens in Iraq, although Gorbachev argued that the Iraqis were the clear aggressors in the situation. In November the Soviets endorsed a UN Resolution permitting force to be used in expelling the Iraqi Army from Kuwait. Gorbachev later called it a "watershed" in world politics, "the first time the superpowers acted together in a regional crisis". However, when the U.S. announced plans for a ground invasion, Gorbachev opposed it, urging instead a peaceful solution. In October 1990, Gorbachev was awarded the Nobel Peace Prize; he was flattered but acknowledged "mixed feelings" about the accolade. Polls indicated that 90% of Soviet citizens disapproved of the award, which was widely seen as a Western and anti-Soviet accolade.

With the Soviet budget deficit climbing and no domestic money markets to provide the state with loans, Gorbachev looked elsewhere. Throughout 1991, Gorbachev requested sizable loans from Western countries and Japan, hoping to keep the Soviet economy afloat and ensure the success of perestroika. Although the Soviet Union had been excluded from the G7, Gorbachev secured an invitation to its London summit in July 1991. There, he continued to call for financial assistance; Mitterrand and Kohl backed him, while Thatcher—no longer in office— also urged Western leaders to agree. Most G7 members were reluctant, instead offering technical assistance and proposing the Soviets receive "special associate" status—rather than full membership—of the World Bank and International Monetary Fund. Gorbachev was frustrated that the U.S. would spend $100 billion on the Gulf War but would not offer his country loans. Other countries were more forthcoming; West Germany had given the Soviets DM60 billion by mid-1991. Bush visited Moscow in late July, when he and Gorbachev concluded ten years of negotiations by signing the START I treaty, a bilateral agreement on the reduction and limitation of strategic offensive arms.

August putsch and government crises 

At the 28th Communist Party Congress in July 1990, hardliners criticized the reformists but Gorbachev was re-elected party leader with the support of three-quarters of delegates and his choice of deputy general secretary, Vladimir Ivashko, was also elected. Seeking compromise with the liberalizers, Gorbachev assembled a team of both his own and Yeltsin's advisers to come up with an economic reform package: the result was the "500 Days" programme. This called for further decentralization and some privatization. Gorbachev described the plan as "modern socialism" rather than a return to capitalism but had many doubts about it. In September, Yeltsin presented the plan to the Russian Supreme Soviet, which backed it. Many in the Communist Party and state apparatus warned against it, arguing that it would create marketplace chaos, rampant inflation, and unprecedented levels of unemployment. The 500 Days plan was abandoned. At this, Yeltsin railed against Gorbachev in an October speech, claiming that Russia would no longer accept a subordinate position to the Soviet government.

By mid-November 1990, much of the press was calling for Gorbachev to resign and predicting civil war. Hardliners were urging Gorbachev to disband the presidential council and arrest vocal liberals in the media. In November, he addressed the Supreme Soviet where he announced an eight-point program, which included governmental reforms, among them the abolition of the presidential council. By this point, Gorbachev was isolated from many of his former close allies and aides. Yakovlev had moved out of his inner circle and Shevardnadze had resigned. His support among the intelligentsia was declining, and by the end of 1990 his approval ratings had plummeted.

Amid growing dissent in the Baltics, especially Lithuania, in January 1991 Gorbachev demanded that the Lithuanian Supreme Council rescind its pro-independence reforms. Soviet troops occupied several Vilnius buildings and attacked protesters, 15 of whom were killed. Gorbachev was widely blamed by liberalizers, with Yeltsin calling for his resignation. Gorbachev denied sanctioning the military operation, although some in the military claimed that he had; the truth of the matter was never clearly established. Fearing more civil disturbances, that month Gorbachev banned demonstrations and ordered troops to patrol Soviet cities alongside the police. This further alienated the liberalizers but was not enough to win over hardliners. Wanting to preserve the Union, in April Gorbachev and the leaders of nine Soviet republics jointly pledged to prepare a treaty that would renew the federation under a new constitution; but six of the republics—Estonia, Latvia, Lithuania, Moldova, Georgia, and Armenia—did not endorse this. A referendum on the issue brought 76.4% in favor of continued federation but the six rebellious republics had not taken part. Negotiations took place to decide what form the new constitution would take, again bringing together Gorbachev and Yeltsin in discussion; it was planned to be formally signed in August.

In August, Gorbachev and his family holidayed at their dacha, "Zarya" ('Dawn') in Foros, Crimea. Two weeks into his holiday, a group of senior Communist Party figures—the "Gang of Eight"—calling themselves the State Committee on the State of Emergency launched a coup d'état to seize control of the Soviet Union. The phone lines to his dacha were cut and a group arrived, including Boldin, Shenin, Baklanov, and General Varennikov, informing him of the take-over. The coup leaders demanded that Gorbachev formally declare a state of emergency in the country, but he refused. Gorbachev and his family were kept under house arrest in their dacha. The coup plotters publicly announced that Gorbachev was ill and thus Vice President Yanayev would take charge of the country.

Yeltsin, now President of the Russian Soviet Federative Socialist Republic, went inside the Moscow White House. Tens of thousands of protesters massed outside it to prevent troops storming the building to arrest him. Gorbachev feared that the coup plotters would order him killed, so had his guards barricade his dacha. However, the coup's leaders realized that they lacked sufficient support and ended their efforts. On 21 August, Vladimir Kryuchkov, Dmitry Yazov, Oleg Baklanov, Anatoly Lukyanov, and Vladimir Ivashko arrived at Gorbachev's dacha to inform him that they were doing so.

That evening, Gorbachev returned to Moscow, where he thanked Yeltsin and the protesters for helping to undermine the coup. At a subsequent press conference, he pledged to reform the Soviet Communist Party. Two days later, he resigned as its general secretary and called on the Central Committee to dissolve. Several members of the coup committed suicide; others were fired. Gorbachev attended a session of the Russian Supreme Soviet on 23 August, where Yeltsin aggressively criticized him for having appointed and promoted many of the coup members to start with.

Final collapse 

After the coup, the Supreme Soviet indefinitely suspended all Communist Party activity, effectively ending communist rule in the Soviet Union. From then on, the country collapsed with dramatic speed.

On 30 October, Gorbachev attended a conference in Madrid trying to revive the Israeli–Palestinian peace process. The event was co-sponsored by the U.S. and Soviet Union, one of the first examples of such cooperation between the two countries. There, he again met with Bush. En route home, he traveled to France where he stayed with Mitterrand at the latter's home near Bayonne.

To keep unity within the country, Gorbachev continued to pursue plans for a new union treaty but found increasing opposition to the idea of a continued federal state as the leaders of various Soviet republics bowed to growing nationalist pressure. Yeltsin stated that he would veto any idea of a unified state, instead favoring a confederation with little central authority. Only the leaders of Kazakhstan and Kirghizia supported Gorbachev's approach. The referendum in Ukraine on 1 December with a 90% turnout for secession from the Union was a fatal blow; Gorbachev had expected Ukrainians to reject independence.

Without Gorbachev's knowledge, Yeltsin met with Ukrainian President Leonid Kravchuk and Belarusian President Stanislav Shushkevich in Belovezha Forest, near Brest, Belarus, on 8 December and signed the Belavezha Accords, which declared the Soviet Union had ceased to exist and formed the Commonwealth of Independent States (CIS) as its successor. Gorbachev only learned of this development when Shushkevich phoned him; Gorbachev was furious. He desperately looked for an opportunity to preserve the Soviet Union, hoping in vain that the media and intelligentsia might rally against the idea of its dissolution. Ukrainian, Belarusian, and Russian Supreme Soviets then ratified the establishment of the CIS. On 9 December, Gorbachev issued a statement calling the CIS agreement "illegal and dangerous". On 20 December, the leaders of 11 of the 12 remaining republics — all except Georgia — met in Kazakhstan and signed the Alma-Ata Protocol, agreeing to dismantle the Soviet Union and formally establish the CIS. They also provisionally accepted Gorbachev's resignation as president of what remained of the Soviet Union. Accepting the fait accompli of the Soviet Union's dissolution, Gorbachev revealed that he would resign as soon as he saw that the CIS was a reality.

Gorbachev reached a deal with Yeltsin that called for Gorbachev to formally announce his resignation as Soviet President and Commander-in-Chief on 25 December, before vacating the Kremlin by 29 December. Yakovlev, Chernyaev and Shevardnadze joined Gorbachev to help him write a resignation speech. Gorbachev then gave his speech in the Kremlin in front of television cameras, allowing for international broadcast. In it, he announced, "I hereby discontinue my activities at the post of President of the Union of Soviet Socialist Republics." He expressed regret for the breakup of the Soviet Union but cited what he saw as the achievements of his administration: political and religious freedom, the end of totalitarianism, the introduction of democracy and a market economy, and an end to the arms race and Cold War. Gorbachev was the third out of eight Soviet leaders, after Malenkov and Khrushchev, not to die in office. The following day, 26 December, the Soviet of the Republics, the upper house of the Supreme Soviet of the Soviet Union, formally voted the country out of existence. As of 31 December 1991, all Soviet institutions that had not been taken over by Russia ceased to function.

Post-USSR life

1991–1999: Initial years 

Out of office, Gorbachev had more time to spend with his wife and family. He and Raisa initially lived in their dilapidated dacha on Rublevskoe Shosse, and were also allowed to privatize their smaller apartment on Kosygin Street. He focused on establishing his International Foundation for Socio-Economic and Political Studies, or "Gorbachev Foundation", launched in March 1992; Yakovlev and Revenko were its first vice presidents. Its initial tasks were in analyzing and publishing material on the history of perestroika, as well as defending the policy from what it called "slander and falsifications". The foundation also tasked itself with monitoring and critiquing life in post-Soviet Russia, presenting alternative development forms to those pursued by Yeltsin.

To finance his foundation, Gorbachev began lecturing internationally, charging large fees to do so. On a visit to Japan, he was well received and given multiple honorary degrees. In 1992, he toured the U.S. in a Forbes private jet to raise money for his foundation. During the trip he met up with the Reagans for a social visit. From there he went to Spain, where he attended the Expo '92 world fair in Seville and met with Prime Minister Felipe González, who had become a friend of his. He further visited Israel and Germany, where he was received warmly by many politicians who praised his role in facilitating German reunification. To supplement his lecture fees and book sales, Gorbachev appeared in commercials such as a television advertisement for Pizza Hut, another for the ÖBB and photograph advertisements for Apple Computer and Louis Vuitton, enabling him to keep the foundation afloat. With his wife's assistance, Gorbachev worked on his memoirs, which were published in Russian in 1995 and in English the following year. He also began writing a monthly syndicated column for The New York Times.

In 1993, Gorbachev launched Green Cross International, which focused on encouraging sustainable futures, and then the World Political Forum. In 1995, he initiated the World Summit of Nobel Peace Laureates.

Gorbachev had promised to refrain from criticizing Yeltsin while the latter pursued democratic reforms, but soon the two men were publicly criticizing each other again. After Yeltsin's decision to lift price caps generated massive inflation and plunged many Russians into poverty, Gorbachev openly criticized him, comparing the reform to Stalin's policy of forced collectivization. After pro-Yeltsin parties did poorly in the 1993 legislative election, Gorbachev called on him to resign. In 1995, his foundation held a conference on "The Intelligentsia and Perestroika". It was there that Gorbachev proposed to the Duma a law that would reduce many of the presidential powers established by Yeltsin's 1993 constitution. Gorbachev continued to defend perestroika but acknowledged that he had made tactical errors as Soviet leader. While he still believed that Russia was undergoing a process of democratization, he concluded that it would take decades rather than years, as he had previously thought.

In contrast to her husband's political activities, Raisa had focused on campaigning for children's charities. In 1997, she founded a sub-division of the Gorbachev Foundation known as Raisa Maksimovna's Club to focus on improving women's welfare in Russia. The Foundation had initially been housed in the former Social Science Institute building, but Yeltsin introduced limits to the number of rooms it could use there; the American philanthropist Ted Turner then donated over $1 million to enable the foundation to build new premises on the Leningradsky Prospekt. In 1999, Gorbachev made his first visit to Australia, where he gave a speech to the country's parliament. Shortly after, in July, Raisa was diagnosed with leukemia. With the assistance of German Chancellor Gerhard Schröder, she was transferred to a cancer center in Münster, Germany, and there underwent chemotherapy. In September she fell into a coma and died. After Raisa's passing, Gorbachev's daughter Irina and his two granddaughters moved into his Moscow home to live with him. When questioned by journalists, he said that he would never remarry.

1996 presidential campaign

The Russian presidential elections were scheduled for June 1996, and although his wife and most of his friends urged him not to run, Gorbachev decided to do so. He hated the idea that the election would result in a run-off between Yeltsin and Gennady Zyuganov, the Communist Party of the Russian Federation candidate whom Yeltsin saw as a Stalinist hardliner. He never expected to win outright but thought a centrist bloc could be formed around either himself or one of the other candidates with similar views, such as Grigory Yavlinsky, Svyatoslav Fyodorov, or Alexander Lebed. After securing the necessary one million signatures of nomination, he announced his candidacy in March. Launching his campaign, he traveled across Russia giving rallies in twenty cities. He repeatedly faced anti-Gorbachev protesters, while some pro-Yeltsin local officials tried to hamper his campaign by banning local media from covering it or by refusing him access to venues. In the election, Gorbachev came seventh with approximately 386,000 votes, or around 0.5% of the total. Yeltsin and Zyuganov went through to the second round, where the former was victorious.

1999–2008: Promoting social democracy in Putin's Russia 

In December 1999, Yeltsin resigned and was succeeded by his deputy, Vladimir Putin, who then won the March 2000 presidential election. Gorbachev attended Putin's inauguration ceremony in May, the first time he had entered the Kremlin since 1991.
Gorbachev initially welcomed Putin's rise, seeing him as an anti-Yeltsin figure. Although he spoke out against some of the Putin government's actions, Gorbachev also had praise for the new government; in 2002, he said: "I've been in the same skin. That's what allows me to say that what [Putin] has done is in the interest of the majority." At the time, he believed Putin to be a committed democrat who nevertheless had to use "a certain dose of authoritarianism" to stabilize the economy and rebuild the state after the Yeltsin era. At Putin's request, Gorbachev became co-chair of the "Petersburg Dialogue" project between high-ranking Russians and Germans.

In 2000, Gorbachev helped form the Russian United Social Democratic Party. In June 2002, he participated in a meeting with Putin, who praised the venture, suggesting that a center-left party could be good for Russia and that he would be open to working with it. In 2003, Gorbachev's party merged with the Social Democratic Party to form the Social Democratic Party of Russia – which, however, faced much internal division and failed to gain traction with voters. Gorbachev resigned as party leader in May 2004 following a disagreement with the party's chairman over the direction taken in the 2003 election campaign. The party was later banned in 2007 by the Supreme Court of the Russian Federation due to its failure to establish local offices with at least 500 members in the majority of Russian regions, which is required by Russian law for a political organization to be listed as a party. Later that year, Gorbachev founded a new movement, the Union of Social Democrats. Stating that it would not contest the forthcoming elections, Gorbachev declared: "We are fighting for power, but only for power over people's minds".

Gorbachev was critical of U.S. hostility to Putin, arguing that the U.S. government "doesn't want Russia to rise" again as a global power and wants "to continue as the sole superpower in charge of the world". More broadly, Gorbachev was critical of U.S. policy following the Cold War, arguing that the West had attempted to "turn [Russia] into some kind of backwater". He rejected the idea—expressed by Bush—that the U.S. had "won" the Cold War, arguing that both sides had cooperated to end the conflict. He declared that since the fall of the Soviet Union, the U.S., rather than cooperating with Russia, had conspired to build a "new empire headed by themselves". He was critical of how the U.S. had expanded NATO right up to Russia's borders despite their initial assurances that they would not do so, citing this as evidence that the U.S. government could not be trusted. He spoke out against the 1999 NATO bombing of Yugoslavia because it lacked UN backing, as well as the 2003 invasion of Iraq led by the U.S. In June 2004, Gorbachev nevertheless attended Reagan's state funeral, and in 2007 visited New Orleans to see the damage caused by Hurricane Katrina.

2008–2022: Growing criticism of Putin and foreign policy remarks 
Barred by the constitution from serving more than two consecutive terms as president, Putin stood down in 2008 and was succeeded by his chosen successor, Dmitry Medvedev, who reached out to Gorbachev in ways that Putin had not. In September 2008, Gorbachev and business oligarch Alexander Lebedev announced they would form the Independent Democratic Party of Russia, and in May 2009 Gorbachev announced that the launch was imminent. After the outbreak of the Russo-Georgian War between Russia and South Ossetian separatists on one side and Georgia on the other, Gorbachev spoke out against U.S. support for Georgian president Mikheil Saakashvili and for moving to bring the Caucasus into the sphere of its national interest. Gorbachev nevertheless remained critical of Russia's government and criticized the 2011 parliamentary elections as being rigged in favor of the governing party, United Russia, and called for them to be re-held. After protests broke out in Moscow over the election, Gorbachev praised the protesters.

In 2009, Gorbachev released Songs for Raisa, an album of Russian romantic ballads, sung by him and accompanied by musician Andrei Makarevich, to raise money for a charity devoted to his late wife. That year, he also met with U.S. President Barack Obama in efforts to "reset" strained U.S.-Russian relations, and attended an event in Berlin commemorating the twentieth anniversary of the fall of the Berlin Wall.
In 2011, an eightieth birthday gala for him was held at London's Royal Albert Hall, featuring tributes from Shimon Peres, Lech Wałęsa, Michel Rocard, and Arnold Schwarzenegger. Proceeds from the event went to the Raisa Gorbachev Foundation. That year, Medvedev awarded him the Order of St Andrew the Apostle the First-Called.

After Putin announced his intention to run for president in the 2012 election, Gorbachev was opposed to the idea. He complained that Putin's new measures had "tightened the screws" on Russia and that the president was trying to "completely subordinate society", adding that United Russia now "embodied the worst bureaucratic features of the Soviet Communist party".

In 2015, Gorbachev ceased his frequent international traveling. He continued to speak out on issues affecting Russia and the world. In 2014, he defended the Crimean status referendum and Russia's annexation of Crimea that began the Russo-Ukrainian war. In his judgment, while Crimea was transferred from Russia to Ukraine in 1954, when both were part of the Soviet Union, the Crimean people had not been asked at the time, whereas in the 2014 referendum they had. After sanctions were placed on Russia as a result of the annexation, Gorbachev spoke out against them. His comments led to Ukraine banning him from entering the country for five years.

At a November 2014 event marking 25 years since the fall of the Berlin Wall, Gorbachev warned that the ongoing war in Donbas had brought the world to the brink of a new Cold War, and he accused Western powers, particularly the U.S., of adopting an attitude of "triumphalism" towards Russia. In December 2014, he said that both sides in the war in Donbas "have been violating the terms of the ceasefire; both sides are guilty of using dangerous types of weapons and violating human rights", adding that Minsk agreements "form the basis for the settlement" of the conflict. In 2016, he said that "Politicians who think that problems and disputes can be solved by using military force—even as a last resort—should be rejected by society, they should clear the political stage." In July 2016, Gorbachev criticized NATO for deploying more troops to Eastern Europe amid escalating tensions between the military alliance and Russia. In June 2018, he welcomed the Russia–United States summit in Helsinki between Putin and U.S. President Donald Trump, although in October criticized Trump's threat to withdraw from the 1987 Intermediate-Range Nuclear Forces Treaty, saying the move "is not the work of a great mind". He added: "all agreements aimed at nuclear disarmament and the limitation of nuclear weapons must be preserved, for the sake of life on Earth".

Following the death of former President George H.W. Bush in 2018, a critical partner and friend of his time in office, Gorbachev stated that the work they had both accomplished led directly to the end of the Cold War and the nuclear arms race, and that he "deeply appreciated the attention, kindness and simplicity typical of George, Barbara and their large, friendly family".

After the January 6 United States Capitol attack, Gorbachev declared, "The storming of the capitol was clearly planned in advance, and it's obvious by whom." He did not clarify to whom he was referring. Gorbachev also stated that the attack "called into question the future fate of the United States as a nation".

In an interview with Russian news agency TASS on 20 January 2021, Gorbachev said that relations between the United States and Russia are of "great concern", and called on U.S. President Joe Biden to begin talks with the Kremlin to make the two countries' "intentions and actions clearer" and "in order to normalize relations". On 24 December 2021, Gorbachev said that the United States "grew arrogant and self-confident" after the collapse of the Soviet Union, resulting in "a new empire. Hence the idea of NATO expansion". He also endorsed the upcoming security talks between the United States and Russia, saying, "I hope there will be a result."

Gorbachev made no personal comment publicly on the 2022 Russian invasion of Ukraine. Although, on 26 February, his Gorbachev Foundation stated that "we affirm the need for an early cessation of hostilities and immediate start of peace negotiations. There is nothing more precious in the world than human lives." At the end of July 2022, Gorbachev's close friend, journalist Alexei Venediktov, said that Gorbachev was very upset when he found out that Putin had launched an invasion of Ukraine. According to Venediktov, Gorbachev believed that Putin "destroyed his life's work". Gorbachev's interpreter, Pavel Palazhchenko, also stated that Gorbachev was psychologically traumatized by the war before his death.

Political ideology 

According to his university friend Zdeněk Mlynář, in the early 1950s "Gorbachev, like everyone else at the time, was a Stalinist". Mlynář noted, however, that unlike most other Soviet students, Gorbachev did not view Marxism simply as "a collection of axioms to be committed to memory". Biographers Doder and Branson related that after Stalin's death, Gorbachev's "ideology would never be doctrinal again", but noted that he remained "a true believer" in the Soviet system. Doder and Branson noted that at the Twenty-Seventh Party Congress in 1986, Gorbachev was seen to be an orthodox Marxist–Leninist; that year, the biographer Zhores Medvedev stated that "Gorbachev is neither a liberal nor a bold reformist".

By the mid-1980s, when Gorbachev took power, many analysts were arguing that the Soviet Union was declining to the status of a Third World country.
In this context, Gorbachev argued that the Communist Party had to adapt and engage in creative thinking much as Lenin had creatively interpreted and adapted the writings of Karl Marx and Friedrich Engels to the situation of early 20th century Russia. For instance, he thought that rhetoric about global revolution and overthrowing the bourgeoisie—which had been integral to Leninist politics—had become too dangerous in an era where nuclear warfare could obliterate humanity. He began to move away from the Marxist–Leninist belief in class struggle as the engine of political change, instead viewing politics as a ways of co-ordinating the interests of all classes. However, as Gooding noted, the changes that Gorbachev proposed were "expressed wholly within the terms of Marxist-Leninist ideology".

According to Doder and Branson, Gorbachev also wanted to "dismantle the hierarchical military society at home and abandon the grand-style, costly, imperialism abroad". However, Jonathan Steele argued that Gorbachev failed to appreciate why the Baltic nations wanted independence and "at heart he was, and remains, a Russian imperialist". Gooding thought that Gorbachev was "committed to democracy", something marking him out as different from his predecessors. Gooding also suggested that when in power, Gorbachev came to see socialism not as a place on the path to communism, but a destination in itself.

Gorbachev's political outlook was shaped by the 23 years he served as a party official in Stavropol. Doder and Branson thought that throughout most of his political career prior to becoming general secretary, "his publicly expressed views almost certainly reflected a politician's understanding of what should be said, rather than his personal philosophy. Otherwise he could not have survived politically."
Like many Russians, Gorbachev sometimes thought of the Soviet Union as being largely synonymous with Russia and in various speeches described it as "Russia"; in one incident he had to correct himself after calling the USSR "Russia" while giving a speech in Kiev.

McCauley noted that perestroika was "an elusive concept", one which "evolved and eventually meant something radically different over time". McCauley stated that the concept originally referred to "radical reform of the economic and political system" as part of Gorbachev's attempt to motivate the labor force and make management more effective. It was only after initial measures to achieve this proved unsuccessful that Gorbachev began to consider market mechanisms and co-operatives, albeit with the state sector remaining dominant. The political scientist John Gooding suggested that had the perestroika reforms succeeded, the Soviet Union would have "exchanged totalitarian controls for milder authoritarian ones" although not become "democratic in the Western sense". With perestroika, Gorbachev had wanted to improve the existing Marxist–Leninist system but ultimately ended up destroying it. In this, he brought an end to state socialism in the Soviet Union and paved the way for a transition to liberal democracy.

Taubman nevertheless thought Gorbachev remained a socialist. He described Gorbachev as "a true believer—not in the Soviet system as it functioned (or didn't) in 1985 but in its potential to live up to what he deemed its original ideals". He added that "until the end, Gorbachev reiterated his belief in socialism, insisting that it wasn't worthy of the name unless it was truly democratic".
As Soviet leader, Gorbachev believed in incremental reform rather than a radical transformation; he later referred to this as a "revolution by evolutionary means". Doder and Branson noted that over the course of the 1980s, his thought underwent a "radical evolution". Taubman noted that by 1989 or 1990, Gorbachev had transformed into a social democrat. McCauley suggested that by at least June 1991 Gorbachev was a "post-Leninist", having "liberated himself" from Marxism–Leninism. After the fall of the Soviet Union, the newly formed Communist Party of the Russian Federation would have nothing to do with him. However, in 2006, he expressed his continued belief in Lenin's ideas: "I trusted him then and I still do". He claimed that "the essence of Lenin" was a desire to develop "the living creative activity of the masses". Taubman believed that Gorbachev identified with Lenin on a psychological level.

Personal life 

By 1955, his hair was thinning, and by the late 1960s he was bald, revealing a distinctive port-wine stain on the top of his head. Throughout the 1960s, he struggled against obesity and dieted to control the problem; Doder and Branson characterized him as "stocky but not fat". He spoke in a southern Russian accent, and was known to sing both folk and pop songs.

Throughout his life, he tried to dress fashionably. Having an aversion to hard liquor, he drank sparingly and did not smoke. He was protective of his private life and avoided inviting people to his home. Gorbachev cherished his wife, who in turn was protective of him. He was an involved parent and grandparent. He sent his daughter, his only child, to a local school in Stavropol rather than to a school set aside for the children of party elites. Unlike many of his contemporaries in the Soviet administration, he was not a womanizer and was known for treating women respectfully.

Gorbachev was baptized Russian Orthodox and when he was growing up, his grandparents had been practicing Christians. In 2008, there was some press speculation that he was a practicing Christian after he visited the tomb of St Francis of Assisi, to which he publicly clarified that he was an atheist. Since studying at university, Gorbachev considered himself an intellectual; Doder and Branson thought that "his intellectualism was slightly self-conscious", noting that unlike most Russian intelligentsia, Gorbachev was not closely connected "to the world of science, culture, the arts, or education". When living in Stavropol, he and his wife collected hundreds of books. Among his favorite authors were Arthur Miller, Dostoevsky, and Chinghiz Aitmatov, while he also enjoyed reading detective fiction. He enjoyed going for walks, having a love of natural environments, and was also a fan of association football. He favored small gatherings where the assembled discussed topics like art and philosophy rather than the large, alcohol-fueled parties common among Soviet officials.

Personality 
Gorbachev's university friend, Mlynář, described him as "loyal and personally honest". He was self-confident, polite, and tactful; he had a happy and optimistic temperament. He used self-deprecating humor, and sometimes profanities, and often referred to himself in the third person. He was a skilled manager, and had a good memory. A hard worker or workaholic, as general secretary, he would rise at 7:00 or 8:00 in the morning and not go to bed until 1:00 or 2:00. He commuted from the western suburbs between 9 and 10 in the morning and returned home around 8 in the evening. Taubman called him "a remarkably decent man"; he thought Gorbachev to have "high moral standards".

Zhores Medvedev thought him a talented orator, in 1986 stating that "Gorbachev is probably the best speaker there has been in the top Party echelons" since Leon Trotsky. Medvedev also considered Gorbachev "a charismatic leader", something Brezhnev, Andropov, and Chernenko had not been. Doder and Branson called him "a charmer capable of intellectually seducing doubters, always trying to co-opt them, or at least blunt the edge of their criticism". McCauley thought Gorbachev displayed "great tactical skill" in maneuvering successfully between hardline Marxist–Leninists and liberalisers for most of his time as leader, adding, though, that he was "much more skilled at tactical, short-term policy than strategic, long-term thinking", in part because he was "given to making policy on the hoof".

Doder and Branson thought Gorbachev "a Russian to the core, intensely patriotic as only people living in the border regions can be".
Taubman also noted that the former Soviet leader has a "sense of self-importance and self-righteousness" as well as a "need for attention and admiration" which grated on some of his colleagues. He was sensitive to personal criticism and easily took offense. Colleagues were often frustrated that he would leave tasks unfinished, and sometimes also felt underappreciated and discarded by him. Biographers Doder and Branson thought that Gorbachev was "a puritan" with "a proclivity for order in his personal life". Taubman noted that he was "capable of blowing up for calculated effect". He also thought that by 1990, when his domestic popularity was waning, Gorbachev had become "psychologically dependent on being lionized abroad", a trait for which he was criticized in the Soviet Union. McCauley was of the view that "one of his weaknesses was an inability to foresee the consequences of his actions".

Death 

Gorbachev died at the Central Clinical Hospital in Moscow on 30 August 2022, at the age of 91. He died after a "severe and prolonged illness," according to the hospital.

Preceding deterioration of health 

For a number of years before his death, Gorbachev suffered from severe diabetes and underwent several surgeries and hospital stays. In April 2011, Gorbachev underwent complex spinal surgery in Germany, at the Munich clinic Schön Klinik München Harlaching. On 11 June 2013, it was reported that Gorbachev was hospitalized for a routine examination. Two months earlier, he had not come to the funeral of Margaret Thatcher for health reasons. On 22 October 2013, it became known that Gorbachev was undergoing another  examination in a German clinic. He was also hospitalized in the Central Clinical Hospital on 9 October 2014. Also in 2014, Gorbachev underwent oral surgery. Gorbachev was briefly hospitalized in May 2015 as well. In November 2016, Gorbachev had a pacemaker installed at the Moscow Central Clinical Hospital. Also in 2016, he underwent surgery to replace his lenses due to cataracts.

The length of his hospital visits increased in 2019, with Gorbachev hospitalized in December with pneumonia. At the beginning of 2020, Gorbachev was placed under the continuous supervision of doctors. Gorbachev's condition deteriorated even further in July 2022 as he developed kidney problems, which led to him being transferred for hemodialysis. Shortly before his death, Gorbachev underwent four more operations, lost 40 kilograms of weight, and could no longer walk. In interviews given shortly before his death, Gorbachev had complained about health and appetite problems. Gorbachev was receiving palliative care, but was allowed to leave the hospital for short periods of time. On 29 August 2022, Gorbachev arrived at the Central Clinical Hospital for another hemodialysis, where he died on 30 August at approximately 10:00 p.m. Moscow time.

Funeral and burial 

A funeral for Gorbachev was held on 3 September 2022 from 10 a.m. to 12 noon in the Column Hall of the House of Unions. The ceremony included an honor guard, but was not an official state funeral. The service included rites administered by a Russian Orthodox priest. Russian president Vladimir Putin bid an official farewell to Gorbachev on 1 September 2022 during a visit to the Central Clinical Hospital, where he laid flowers at his coffin. His press secretary Dmitry Peskov said that the "tight schedule of the president" would not allow him to be present at the funeral, as he was scheduled to visit Kaliningrad. Gorbachev was buried on the same day at Moscow's Novodevichy Cemetery, in the same grave as his wife Raisa, as requested by his will.

Reactions
Russian president Vladimir Putin expressed his condolences on the death of Gorbachev, and paid tribute to him at the Moscow hospital where the ex-president had died but, according to spokesman Dmitry Peskov, had no time to attend his funeral due to a busy work schedule. Putin also sent a telegram to Gorbachev's family, calling him "a politician and statesman who had a huge impact on the course of world history". Russian prime minister Mikhail Mishustin called Gorbachev an "outstanding statesman". Other reactions were less positive, with the leader of Russia's Communist Party, Gennady Zyuganov, stating that Gorbachev was a leader whose rule brought "absolute sadness, misfortune and problems" for "all the peoples of our country". Naina Yeltsina, widow of former Russian president Boris Yeltsin, said that Gorbachev "sincerely wanted to change the Soviet system" and transform the USSR into a "free and peaceful state".

European Commission president Ursula von der Leyen paid tribute to him on Twitter, as did the UK's Prime Minister Boris Johnson, former U.S. secretary of state Condoleezza Rice and Ireland's Taoiseach Micheál Martin.

United Nations secretary-general António Guterres said Gorbachev was a "one-of-a-kind statesman who changed the course of history and a towering global leader, committed multilateralist, and tireless advocate for peace", as former U.S. Secretary of State James Baker III stated that "history will remember Mikhail Gorbachev as a giant who steered his great nation towards democracy" in the context of the Cold War's conclusion. Queen Elizabeth II (who herself died nine days after Gorbachev) in her condolence stated that "through his courage and vision, he gained the admiration, affection and respect of the British people". Canadian Prime Minister Justin Trudeau said "He helped bring an end to the Cold War, embraced reforms in the Soviet Union, and reduced the threat of nuclear weapons. He leaves behind an important legacy," while former Canadian Prime Minister Brian Mulroney said that "he was a very pleasant man to deal with" and "history will remember him as a transformational leader". French President Emmanuel Macron called Gorbachev "a man of peace whose choices opened up a path of liberty for Russians". U.S. President Joe Biden called Gorbachev "a man of remarkable vision". Polish Foreign Minister Zbigniew Rau stated that Gorbachev had "increased the scope of freedom of the enslaved peoples of the Soviet Union in an unprecedented way, giving them hope for a more dignified life". Lithuanian Foreign Minister Gabrielius Landsbergis said that Lithuanians would not glorify Gorbachev or forget about the 1991 January Events.

The 14th Dalai Lama wrote to the Gorbachev Foundation to express his "condolences to his daughter, Irina Virganskaya and members of his family, his friends and supporters". Japan's Prime Minister Fumio Kishida said Gorbachev had "left behind great [accomplishments] as a world leader supporting the abolishment of nuclear weapons". Germany's former chancellor Angela Merkel, who grew up in East Germany, said he completely changed her life and the world while current German chancellor Olaf Scholz hailed Gorbachev's role in reuniting Germany.

Reception and legacy 

Opinions on Gorbachev are deeply divided. According to a 2017 survey carried out by the independent institute Levada Center, 46% of Russian citizens have a negative opinion towards Gorbachev, 30% are indifferent, while only 15% have a positive opinion. Many, particularly in Western countries, see him as the greatest statesman of the second half of the 20th century. U.S. press referred to the presence of "Gorbymania" in Western countries during the late 1980s and early 1990s, as represented by large crowds that turned out to greet his visits, with Time naming him its "Man of the Decade" in the 1980s. In the Soviet Union itself, opinion polls indicated that Gorbachev was the most popular politician from 1985 through to late 1989. For his domestic supporters, Gorbachev was seen as a reformer trying to modernise the Soviet Union, and to build a form of democratic socialism. Taubman characterized Gorbachev as "a visionary who changed his country and the world—though neither as much as he wished". Taubman regarded Gorbachev as being "exceptional ... as a Russian ruler and a world statesman", highlighting that he avoided the "traditional, authoritarian, anti-Western norm" of both predecessors like Brezhnev and successors like Putin. McCauley thought that in allowing the Soviet Union to move away from Marxism–Leninism, Gorbachev gave the Soviet people "something precious, the right to think and manage their lives for themselves", with all the uncertainty and risk that that entailed.

Gorbachev's negotiations with the U.S. helped bring an end to the Cold War and reduced the threat of nuclear conflict. His decision to allow the Eastern Bloc to break apart prevented significant bloodshed in Central and Eastern Europe; as Taubman noted, this meant that the "Soviet Empire" ended in a far more peaceful manner than the British Empire several decades before. Similarly, under Gorbachev, the Soviet Union broke apart without falling into civil war, as happened during the breakup of Yugoslavia at the same time. McCauley noted that in facilitating the merger of East and West Germany, Gorbachev was "a co-father of German unification", assuring him long-term popularity among the German people. However he remains a controversial figure in the Baltic states for his role in suppressing pro-independence movements.

He also faced domestic criticism during his rule. During his career, Gorbachev attracted the admiration of some colleagues, but others came to hate him. Across society more broadly, his inability to reverse the decline in the Soviet economy brought discontent. Liberals thought he lacked the radicalism to really break from Marxism–Leninism and establish a free market liberal democracy. Conversely, many of his Communist Party critics thought his reforms were reckless and threatened the survival of Soviet socialism; some believed he should have followed the example of China's Communist Party and restricted himself to economic rather than governmental reforms. Many Russians saw his emphasis on persuasion rather than force as a sign of weakness.

For much of the Communist Party nomenklatura, the Soviet Union's dissolution was disastrous as it resulted in their loss of power. In Russia, he is widely despised for his role in the collapse of the Soviet Union and the ensuing economic collapse in the 1990s. General Varennikov, one of those who orchestrated the 1991 coup attempt against Gorbachev, for instance called him "a renegade and traitor to your own people". Many of his critics attacked him for allowing the Marxist–Leninist governments across Eastern Europe to fall, and for allowing a reunited Germany to join NATO, something they deem to be contrary to Russia's national interest.

The historian Mark Galeotti stressed the connection between Gorbachev and his predecessor, Andropov. In Galeotti's view, Andropov was "the godfather of the Gorbachev revolution", because—as a former head of the KGB—he was able to put forward the case for reform without having his loyalty to the Soviet cause questioned, an approach that Gorbachev was able to build on and follow through with. According to McCauley, Gorbachev "set reforms in motion without understanding where they could lead. Never in his worst nightmare could he have imagined that perestroika would lead to the destruction of the Soviet Union".

According to The New York Times, "Few leaders in the 20th century, indeed in any century, have had such a profound effect on their time. In little more than six tumultuous years, Mr. Gorbachev lifted the Iron Curtain, decisively altering the political climate of the world."

Awards and honors 

In 1988, India awarded Gorbachev the Indira Gandhi Prize for Peace, Disarmament and Development; in 1990, he was given the Nobel Peace Prize for "his leading role in the peace process which today characterizes important parts of the international community". Out of office he continued to receive honors. In 1992, he was the first recipient of the Ronald Reagan Freedom Award, and in 1994 was given the Grawemeyer Award by the University of Louisville, Kentucky. In 1995, he was awarded the Grand-Cross of the Order of Liberty by Portuguese President Mário Soares, and in 1998 the Freedom Award from the National Civil Rights Museum in Memphis, Tennessee. In 2000, he was presented with the Golden Plate Award of the American Academy of Achievement at an awards ceremony at Hampton Court Palace near London. In 2002, Gorbachev received the Freedom of the City of Dublin from Dublin City Council.

In 2002, Gorbachev was awarded the Charles V Prize by the European Academy of Yuste Foundation. Gorbachev, together with Bill Clinton and Sophia Loren, were awarded the 2004 Grammy Award for Best Spoken Word Album for Children for their recording of Sergei Prokofiev's 1936 Peter and the Wolf for Pentatone. In 2005, Gorbachev was awarded the Point Alpha Prize for his role in supporting German reunification.

Bibliography

In popular culture
In 2020/2021, the Theatre of Nations in Moscow, in collaboration with Latvian director Alvis Hermanis, staged a production called Gorbachev. Yevgeny Mironov and Chulpan Khamatova played the roles of Gorbachev and his wife Raisa respectively. It was a play focusing on their personal relationship.

See also 

 Index of Soviet Union–related articles
 Khomeini's letter to Mikhail Gorbachev
 List of international trips made by Mikhail Gorbachev
 List of peace activists
 List of Nobel Peace Prize laureates

Explanatory notes

References

Citations

Sources

Further reading

 Brown, Archie. The human factor: Gorbachev, Reagan, and Thatcher, and the end of the Cold War (Oxford University Press, 2020).
 Duncan, W. Raymond, and Carolyn McGiffert Ekedahl. Moscow and the third world under Gorbachev (Routledge, 2019).
 Eklof, Ben. Soviet briefing: Gorbachev and the reform period (Routledge, 2019).
 Kotkin, Stephen. Armageddon Averted: The Soviet Collapse, 1970–2000 (2nd ed. 2008) excerpt 
 Kramer, Mark. "Mikhail Gorbachev and the Origins of Perestroika: A Retrospective." Demokratizatsiya: The Journal of Post-Soviet Democratization 29.3 (2021): 255–258.
 Lane, David. "The Gorbachev revolution: The role of the political elite in regime disintegration." Political studies 44.1 (1996): 4-23.
 McHugh, James T. "Last of the enlightened despots: A comparison of President Mikhail Gorbachev and Emperor Joseph II." Social Science Journal 32.1 (1995): 69–85 online abstract  .
 Woodby, Sylvia Babus. Gorbachev and the decline of ideology in Soviet foreign policy (Routledge, 2019).

 Ostrovsky, Alexander (2010). Кто поставил Горбачёва? (Who put Gorbachev?)  – М.: Алгоритм-Эксмо, 2010. – 544 с. ISBN 978-5-699-40627-2.
 Ostrovsky, Alexander (2011). Глупость или измена? Расследование гибели СССР. (Stupidity or treason? Investigation of the death of the USSR)  М.: Форум, Крымский мост-9Д, 2011. – 864 с. ISBN 978-5-89747-068-6.

External links 

 Official website
 
 

 
1931 births
2022 deaths
Gorbachev
Central Committee of the Communist Party of the Soviet Union members
Club of Rome members
Collars of the Order of the White Lion
Commandeurs of the Ordre des Arts et des Lettres
Former Russian Orthodox Christians
Grammy Award winners
Grand Crosses Special Class of the Order of Merit of the Federal Republic of Germany
Heads of state of the Soviet Union
Heads of the Communist Party of the Soviet Union
Honorary Members of the Russian Academy of Arts
Illeists
Members of the Supreme Soviet of the Soviet Union
Moscow State University alumni
Nobel Peace Prize laureates
People from Stavropol
People of the 1991 Soviet coup d'état attempt
People of the Cold War
People of the Soviet–Afghan War
Politburo of the Central Committee of the Communist Party of the Soviet Union members
Recipients of the Order of Honour (Russia)
Recipients of the Order of Lenin
Recipients of the Order of the Red Banner of Labour
Recipients of the Ronald Reagan Freedom Award
Reformers
Russian activists against the 2022 Russian invasion of Ukraine
Russian anti–nuclear weapons activists
Soviet anti–nuclear weapons activists
Russian atheists
Russian Nobel laureates
Russian democracy activists
Russian people of Ukrainian descent
Russian social democrats
Soviet Nobel laureates
Soviet reformers
Soviet democracy activists
Time Person of the Year
Burials at Novodevichy Cemetery